Antonio Sinchi Roca Inka (17th century), was a Quechua painter from Peru and part of the Cuzco School.

Background
His exact years of birth and death are not known, but Inka is from the town of Maras, Peru, located 40.8 kilometers northwest of Cuzco.

Name
Sinchi Roca is the name of the second Sapa Inca who ruled the Inca Empire in the 13th century. The artist is often known simply as Antonio Sinchi Roca or Antonio Sinchi Roca Inca.

Artwork
Inka was primarily a religious-themed painter, who performed works for church commissions. His style is of the Cuzco School. A major patron of the Cusco artists Bishop Manuel de Mollinedo y Angulo was one who financially assisted Inka.

Collections
Inka's work is in the Cathedral of Santo Domingo, Cusco, which feature prophets, evangelists, and sacraments. His paintings are also in the Church of St. Francis of Assisi in Maras.

Notes

References
 Fane, Diana, ed. Converging Cultures: Art and Identity in Spanish America. New York: Harry N. Abrams Inc., 1996. .

Further reading
 Velarde, Teófilo Benavente, Alejandro Martínez Frisancho.  El pintor de la colonia Don Antonio Sinchi Rocca Inca. Cuzco, Peru: H.G. Rozas S.A., 1965.

Year of birth unknown
Year of death unknown
Peruvian Mannerist painters
Cusco School
Quechua people
17th-century indigenous painters of the Americas
People from Cusco Region